The Wedding Day (Swedish: Brollopsdagen) is a 1960 Swedish comedy film directed by Kenne Fant and starring Max von Sydow, Bibi Andersson and Edvin Adolphson. The film's sets were designed by the art director Bibi Lindström.

Cast
 Max von Sydow as Anders Frost
 Bibi Andersson as Sylvia Blom
 Edvin Adolphson as 	Johannes Blom
 Elsa Carlsson as Victoria Blom
 Jullan Kindahl as 	Asta
 Allan Edwall as 	Vicar 
 Ragnar Falck as 	Organist 
 Christina Schollin as 	Titti

References

Bibliography 
 Qvist, Per Olov & von Bagh, Peter. Guide to the Cinema of Sweden and Finland. Greenwood Publishing Group, 2000.

External links 
 

1960 films
Swedish comedy films
1960 comedy films
1960s Swedish-language films
Films directed by Kenne Fant
1960s Swedish films